Anthericopsis is a genus of monocotyledonous flowering plants in the dayflower family, Commelinaceae. It was first described as a genus in 1897. The genus consists of a single known species, Anthericopsis sepalosa, native to central and eastern Africa (Ethiopia, Somalia, Tanzania, Kenya, Zaire, Zambia, Mozambique, Malawi).

References

Commelinaceae
Monotypic Commelinales genera
Flora of Africa